Félix Machado (born August 22, 1972 in Guyana) is a Venezuelan featherweight boxer. He currently resides in Bolívar, Venezuela.

He is a former IBF super flyweight champion, defeating Julio Gamboa on July 22, 2000 for the vacant title. Machado successfully defended the title three times before losing to Luis Alberto Pérez by a split decision on January 4, 2003.

References

External links
 

1972 births
Living people
People from Bolívar (state)
Southpaw boxers
International Boxing Federation champions
Venezuelan male boxers
Featherweight boxers
20th-century Venezuelan people
21st-century Venezuelan people